Piyawat Thongman is a former professional footballer from Thailand.

He has played several times for the Thailand national football team, including appearances in several 2006 FIFA World Cup qualifying matches.

Honours

International 
Thailand U-23
 Sea Games  Gold Medal (1); 2003

International goals

References

1982 births
Living people
Piyawat Thongman
Piyawat Thongman
Association football forwards
Southeast Asian Games medalists in football
Piyawat Thongman
Competitors at the 2003 Southeast Asian Games
Piyawat Thongman
Piyawat Thongman
Piyawat Thongman
Piyawat Thongman
Piyawat Thongman
Piyawat Thongman
Piyawat Thongman
Piyawat Thongman